Dude Perfect (DP) is an American sports and comedy group headquartered in Frisco, Texas. The group currently consists of Tyler "Beard” Toney, twins Cory and Coby Cotton, Garrett "Purple Hoser" Hilbert, and Cody "Tall Guy" Jones, all of whom are former college roommates at Texas A&M University. Their YouTube channel has over 58.9 million subscribers and is the second-most-subscribed sports channel as well as the 23rd-most-subscribed channel overall. Dude Perfect also has two other YouTube channels, Dude Perfect Plus and Dude Perfect Gaming, which are currently inactive.

Content created by Dude Perfect predominantly consists of videos depicting various trick shots, stereotypes, and stunts. The group also regularly uploads videos of "battles," in which the individual members of Dude Perfect compete against one another in a good-natured game or contest, incorporating different sports and a unique set of rules. Dude Perfect also created the show Overtime, a series where they host several segments, such as "Wheel Unfortunate", in which a contestant spins a wheel and gets a random penalty, and "Absurd Recurds", in which the Dudes attempt to break the most absurd world record they can find.

History

Early years
On April 9, 2009, a video of the group performing trick shots at Tyler Toney's house and a local public park was released on YouTube. Within a week, the video received 200,000 views and was mentioned on Good Morning America.

The group's second video, filmed at a Christian summer camp, was released shortly thereafter. The video amassed over 18 million views and it became unequivocally famous. The trick shot group which had been founded would never imagine singing lyrics such as "hatin' your gut" in Pet Peeves, their hit song. For every 100,000 views the video received, Dude Perfect pledged to sponsor a child from Compassion International, but now, they fail to do that. After the videos went viral, ESPN contacted Dude Perfect. Clips from Dude Perfect videos subsequently appeared on First Take, Pardon the Interruption, Around the Horn and SportsNation.

In 2010, Dude Perfect introduced the Panda mascot. The Panda quickly grew into a popular symbol at Texas A&M basketball games when taunting players of the opposing team.

Professional endorsements and collaborations
Dude Perfect has worked with Green Bay Packers quarterback Aaron Rodgers, NBA star Chris Paul, Australian ten-pin bowler Jason Belmonte, actor Paul Rudd, singer Tim McGraw, Seattle Seahawks coach Pete Carroll and quarterback Russell Wilson, wide receiver Ryan Swope, volleyball star Morgan Beck, Heisman Trophy winner and former quarterback Johnny Manziel at Kyle Field, Tennessee Titans quarterback Ryan Tannehill, the United States Olympic team, NASCAR drivers Ricky Stenhouse Jr., Travis Pastrana, James Buescher and IndyCar Series driver James Hinchcliffe at Texas Motor Speedway.

The group has also collaborated with Dale Earnhardt Jr., Los Angeles Rams wide receiver Odell Beckham Jr., New Orleans Saints quarterback Drew Brees and coach Sean Payton, the Seattle Seahawks, and St. Louis Rams players Greg Zuerlein, Johnny Hekker and Jake McQuaide, Dallas Stars players Tyler Seguin and Jamie Benn, tennis player Serena Williams and country singer Luke Bryan. In 2016, Dude Perfect traveled to the United Kingdom to film a video with players of Manchester City, Arsenal and Chelsea. In 2020, Dude Perfect released their fourth All Sports Golf Battle that was pre-recorded in 2019 with actor Zac Efron, who finished third in the finale. The group also got a chance to visit the US Navy's Nimitz-class aircraft carrier USS Nimitz for a 3-day trip aboard and released their trip's video as an episode as part of their Bucket List. Dude Perfect also visited South Africa in their second bucket list video. In 2021, Dude Perfect released episode 27 of "Overtime", which featured a cameo from Dallas Mavericks center Boban Marjanovic. In 2022, Dallas Mavericks star Luka Dončić appeared in an episode of "Overtime".

Business ventures
In 2011, Dude Perfect launched a free mobile game for iOS and Android, titled Dude Perfect. The group subsequently released Dude Perfect 2, and other games titled Endless Ducker and That's Lit. Following the release of the mobile apps, Cory Cotton authored a nationally published book titled Go Big, in which he shared the secrets the group has learned along the way building a business in a world largely influenced by social media.

In June 2015, the group was selected by the Harlem Globetrotters in their annual player draft.

In September 2015, the group was approved for a television series entitled The Dude Perfect Show on CMT, which began airing during the first half of 2016. The show's second season aired on Viacom sibling network Nickelodeon.

In 2019, Dude Perfect went on their very first live tour. In 2020, the group also announced their second live tour, which was later postponed to 2021 due to the COVID-19 pandemic.

In 2020, Dude Perfect partnered with Serious Bean Co. to develop a new flavor of baked beans,  The group also partnered with TruLabs to sell personalized products and merchandise.

Partnering with YouTube Originals in 2020, Dude Perfect released a documentary: 'Backstage Pass'. The documentary provided a behind-the-scenes look at their live tour: 'Pound It, Noggin'.

In 2021, Dude Perfect released their first song, titled "The Pet Peeves Song", on May 3, 2021. Later that same year, a book, Dude Perfect 101 Tricks, Tips, and Cool Stuff, written by Travis Thrasher and authorized by the group, was announced; the hard copy of the book was released on June 22.The book contains behind-the-scenes of many of their ventures, as well as deeper looks on each member. The book also contains how-tos for many at-home trick shots.

World records
In 2009, the group set the Guinness world record for the longest basketball shot after shooting from the third deck of Kyle Field. In October 2010, Dude Perfect extended their record with a "cross-tower" shot from a height of 66 meters (216 feet); the basket was located 45 meters (150 feet) away from the tower's base. In March 2011, Dude Perfect unofficially broke their record again with a shot from the top of Reliant Stadium, which remained in the air for 5.3 seconds. In January 2014, the group successfully attempted a shot from the 561-foot-tall Reunion Tower, with Cody Jones and Garrett Hilbert holding the basket at the base of the tower. In their 2016 video, “World Record Edition,” Dude Perfect broke multiple world records. The group broke the world records for longest basketball shot, highest basketball shot, longest blindfolded basketball shot, and longest sitting basketball shot. Subsequently, they released a sequel based on football the following year, in which they broke even more world records.

In 2018, Dude Perfect broke the record for longest barefoot Lego walk and longest pea blow during their filming of "Overtime." In episode six of "Overtime," Dude Perfect broke the record for the farthest distance travelled rolling across exercise balls. In 2019, Dude Perfect broke the world record for most Ping Pong balls stuck on a person's head using shaving cream, and the most donuts stacked on each other while blindfolded. In 2020, they broke another record for the most beachball header passes in 30 seconds.

In 2019, on Nickelodeon's The Dude Perfect Show, the group set 6 world records: fastest time to wrap a person with wrapping paper (team of two), most party poppers popped in 30 seconds (team of two), most thumbtacks inserted into a corkboard in a minute, most eggs crushed with the toes in 30 seconds, most drink cans opened with one hand in a minute, farthest distance traveled on Swiss balls.

Dude Perfect currently holds 14 Guinness World Records.

Legitimacy
Amid their success, questions arose over the legitimacy of the group's trick shots. Hosts on Good Morning America discussed the tricks and debated whether they were real, though experts contacted by the show stated they were unable to find evidence of the tricks being fake.

Regarding the doubts, group member Cody Jones said: "We love it when people claim it's fake, because it makes the shots seem even more ridiculously impossible; and we get more publicity and hits on YouTube, so we love the mystery of knowing whether it's real or fake."

References

Streamy Award-winning channels, series or shows
Texas A&M University alumni
YouTube channels launched in 2009
Multinational companies headquartered in the United States
Companies based in Frisco, Texas
Entertainment companies of the United States
YouTubers from Texas
American Internet groups
Sports YouTubers
American YouTube groups
Sports trick shot artists